The 2 July 2011 Zabul province bombing was a roadside bombing that killed 11 members of a family in Zabul Province, Shamulzayi District, Afghanistan, thought to be refugees returning from Pakistan heading to Ghazni Province.

References

2011 murders in Afghanistan
Mass murder in 2011
Improvised explosive device bombings in Afghanistan
Terrorist incidents in Afghanistan in 2011
History of Zabul Province
July 2011 events in Afghanistan